Eulachnesia is a genus of longhorn beetles of the subfamily Lamiinae, containing the following species:

 Eulachnesia amoena Galileo & Martins, 2005
 Eulachnesia cobaltina Bates, 1881
 Eulachnesia humeralis (Fabricius, 1801)
 Eulachnesia monnei Martins & Galileo, 1996
 Eulachnesia smaragdina Bates, 1872

References

Hemilophini